Vadgaon Rasai (also known as Wadgaon Rasai) is a town in Maharashtra, India. It is located in the Shirur taluka of Pune district. The Bhima river flows through the village. The temple of Rasai Devi is located here.

According to the 2011 census of India, the population of the village is 6,383.

References

External links 
 Wadgaon Rasai Panchayat

Villages in Pune district